Don Giovanni Records is an independent record label originally specializing in punk rock from the New Brunswick, New Jersey music scene but eventually working with a variety of artists from different genres. Its also operated out of Lansing, Michigan.

History
Don Giovanni Records was founded by Joe Steinhardt and Zach Gajewski while they were living in Boston in 2004.

The label is best known for developing artists like Screaming Females, Mitski, Waxahatchee, Laura Stevenson, and Moor Mother, as well as fostering a geographically diverse community of artists, including Mal Blum, Native American Music Award “Best Artist” winner Keith Secola, Holy Modal Rounders founder, Peter Stampfel, Lavender Country, Swamp Dogg, Alice Bag, and comedian Chris Gethard. 

Steinhardt and Gajewski started the label while playing in bands and attending college at Boston University where the two met. After graduation they moved to New Brunswick, where Steinhardt was from, in order to make the label a full-time operation.

In 2016, Steinhardt launched the New Alternative Music Festival.

The label has been vocally critical of Record Store Day and streaming music as well as other social issues within the music industry.

In 2020 the label relocated to Philadelphia, Pennsylvania.

Roster

Artists such as Screaming Females, Moor Mother, Mitski, Laura Stevenson, Waxahatchee, Bad Bad Hats, Sammus, Downtown Boys, The Ergs!, Swamp Dogg, Priests, Tenement, P.S. Eliot, Jeffrey Lewis, Peter Stampfel, Worriers, and Lavender Country as well as comedian Chris Gethard have released records on Don Giovanni. The label has also published books from authors Larry Livermore and Bela Koe-Krömpecher.

See also
 List of record labels
 DIY ethic

References

External links

 
American independent record labels
Record labels established in 2004
Punk record labels
Companies based in Philadelphia
Companies based in New Brunswick, New Jersey
New Jersey record labels
Mass media in New Jersey
Indie rock record labels
Rock record labels
Alternative rock record labels
Post-hardcore record labels
Hardcore record labels